Edwin Brown (1898–1972) was an Australian rugby league player.

Edwin Brown may also refer to:

Edwin Brown (actor) (died 1999), British television actor
Edwin Brown (engineer) (born 1938), Australian expert in rock mechanics
Edwin Brown (naturalist) (died 1876), English naturalist and entomologist
Edwin J. Brown (1864–1941), mayor of Seattle 1922–1926
Eddy Brown (1926–2012), full name Edwin Brown, English footballer